The  was a DC electric multiple unit (EMU) train type operated by Keio Corporation on the Keio Inokashira Line in Japan from 1962 until 2011.

Design
The 3000 series was the first Keio rolling stock to use completely stainless steel body construction. A total of 29 5-car sets (145 cars) were built from 1962 by Tokyu Car, and in 1963, the design was the recipient of the third Laurel Prize presented annually by the Japan Railfan Club.

Each trainset featured a livery in one of the seven pastel hues corresponding to a train configuration, a unique feature found only on the Inokashira line. A number of trains were later resold to operate on other lines throughout Japan.

Formation

 Each of the motored cars had a single-arm pantograph.
 Car 3 was designated as a mildly air-conditioned car.

History
The first trains entered service on the Inokashira Line in 1962. The fleet underwent refurbishment from 1996, with the original fibre-reinforced plastic (FRP) cab ends replaced by new steel cab ends with panoramic windscreens and front skirts.

Withdrawal and resale
Withdrawal of the 3000 series fleet began in 1996 following the introduction of new 1000 series sets. The last remaining sets were withdrawn by the end of 2011. The withdrawal dates for the later, refurbished sets were as shown below.

A number of sets were resold to other private railway companies, including the Hokuriku Railroad, Jomo Electric Railway, Gakunan Railway, Matsumoto Electric Railway (Alpico Kotsu), and Iyo Railway. In 2007, it was announced that former 3000 series EMUs would be resold to the Choshi Electric Railway in Choshi, Chiba, and converted to two-car sets. However, this plan was cancelled due to the cost of converting the 1,500 V DC cars to 600 V DC operation.

Hokuriku Railroad
Two early, narrow-body 3000 series sets were resold to the Hokuriku Railroad in Kanazawa, Ishikawa, where they became two-car 8800 series sets 8801 to 8802. Later, wide-body sets were also resold to become two-car 7700 series set 7701 and 8900 series sets 8901 to 8903.

Jomo Electric Railway
Eight 3000 series sets were resold to the Jomo Electric Railway in Gunma Prefecture, where they became two car 700 series sets 711 to 718.

Gakunan Railway
Five former 3000 series cars were resold to the Gakunan Railway in Fuji, Shizuoka, where they became two-car 8000 series set 8001 and three single-car 7000 series units, 7001 to 7003.

Matsumoto Electric Railway (Alpico Kotsu)
Four former 3000 series sets were resold to the Matsumoto Electric Railway (present-day Alpico Kotsu) in Nagano Prefecture, where they became two-car 3000 series sets 3001 to 3007.

Iyo Railway
Ten sets, 3720 to 3729, were resold to the Iyo Railway (Iyotetsu) in Matsuyama, Ehime, where they became three-car 3000 series sets 3301 to 3310.

Preserved examples
Car 3719 is preserved at the Keio Rail-Land open-air museum next to Tama-Dōbutsukōen Station on the Keio Dōbutsuen Line in Hino, Tokyo, which opened in October 2013. Car 3719 was built in 1979 by Tokyo Car, and was withdrawn in March 2009.

References

3000 series
Electric multiple units of Japan
Train-related introductions in 1962
Tokyu Car multiple units
1500 V DC multiple units of Japan